The Twenty-Fourth Wisconsin Legislature convened from  to  in regular session.

Senators representing odd-numbered districts were newly elected for this session and were serving the first year of a two-year term. Assembly members were elected to a one-year term. Assembly members and odd-numbered senators were elected in the general election of November 8, 1870. Senators representing even-numbered districts were serving the second year of their two-year term, having been elected in the general election held on November 2, 1869.

Major events
 January 18, 1871: Proclamation of the German Empire formalized the creation of the German Empire from the North German Confederation and their south German allies.
 April 20, 1871: U.S. President Ulysses S. Grant signed the Civil Rights Act of 1871, commonly known as the "Ku Klux Klan Act".
 May 4, 1871: The first Major League Baseball game was played.
 May 10, 1871: Treaty of Frankfurt ended the Franco-Prussian War and transferred the provinces of Alsace and Lorraine from France to the Germany.
 October 8, 1871: The Peshtigo fire burned about 1.2 million acres in northeast Wisconsin and resulted in more than 1,500 deaths.  The Great Chicago Fire occurred on the same day, killing approximately 300 and destroying 17,500 buildings.
 November 7, 1871: Cadwallader C. Washburn elected Governor of Wisconsin.
 November 17, 1871: The National Rifle Association was granted a charter by the state of New York.

Major legislation
 March 24, 1871: An Act to apportion the state into senate and assembly districts, 1871 Act 156.

Party summary

Senate summary

Assembly summary

Sessions
 1st Regular session: January 11, 1871March 25, 1871

Leaders

Senate leadership
 President of the Senate: Thaddeus C. Pound (R)
 President pro tempore: Charles G. Williams (R)

Assembly leadership
 Speaker of the Assembly: William E. Smith (R)

Members

Members of the Senate
Members of the Senate for the Twenty-Fourth Wisconsin Legislature:

Members of the Assembly
Members of the Assembly for the Twenty-Fourth Wisconsin Legislature:

Employees

Senate employees
 Chief Clerk: O. R. Smith
 Assistant Clerk: J. H. Waggoner
 Bookkeeper: Sid A. Foster
 Engrossing Clerk: A. J. High
 Enrolling Clerk: H. L. Hyde
 Transcribing Clerk: Richard Perry
 Sergeant-at-Arms: W. W. Baker
 Assistant Sergeant-at-Arms: W. W. Dantz
 Postmaster: C. E. Weeks
 Assistant Postmaster: Hiram Seffens
 Doorkeeper: W. G. Hyde
 Doorkeeper: H. E. Seaver
 Assistant Doorkeeper: J. Dixon
 Assistant Doorkeeper: C. W. Watrous
 Assistant Doorkeeper: H. A. Wilcox
 Gallery Doorkeeper: A. A. Petty
 Night Watch: John Grant Jr.
 Governor's Attendant: C. H. Stone
 Porter: F. H. Bates
 General Messenger: Willie Hadley
 Clerk's Messenger: Willie Bowen
 Messengers:
 Willie Dennison
 Frank Roe
 Charles Young
 Charles H. Newton
 Patrick Tierney

Assembly employees
 Chief Clerk: Ephraim W. Young
 Assistant Clerk: William M. Newcomb
 Bookkeeper: Fred A. Dennett
 Engrossing Clerk: C. D. Purple
 Enrolling Clerk: Jacob Fuss
 Transcribing Clerk: Linda Harris
 Sergeant-at-Arms: Sam Fifield
 1st Assistant Sergeant-at-Arms: O. C. Bissell
 2nd Assistant Sergeant-at-Arms: D. L. Quaw
 Postmaster: Myron DeWolf
 1st Assistant Postmaster: J. F. Cleghorn
 2nd Assistant Postmaster: Albert Emonson
 Doorkeepers: 
 E. S. Blake
 Thomas Watson
 John Stansmore
 O. R. Jones
 Night Watch: W. A. Fay
 Firemen:
 D. B. Crandall
 Richard Prichard
 Gallery Attendants: 
 Peter Williams
 A. J. Sutherland
 Committee Room Attendants:
 J. W. Brackett
 L. N. Taylor
 William W. Maxwell
 George Slingsby
 Washroom Attendant: S. D. Hanchett
 Porter: R. S. Warner
 Speaker's Messenger: Willie Holmes
 Chief Clerk's Messenger: Frank R. Norton
 Sergeant-at-Arms' Messenger: Willie Potter
 Messengers:
 Frank Beyler
 Daniel Fitzpatrick
 George E. McDill
 George Sherman
 Freddie Blake
 Ballard P. Barnett
 Eugene Kuntz
 S. G. Huntington
 Charles F. Dana
 Adolph Hastreiter
 Emeal Hammer

References

External links
 1871: Related Documents from Wisconsin Legislature

1871 in Wisconsin
Wisconsin
Wisconsin legislative sessions